Gemma Grainger (born 17 July 1982) is an English football manager and former player who manages the Wales women's national team. She previously managed at club level with Leeds United and Middlesbrough.

Managerial career 
A UEFA Pro Licence since holder 2016, she coached various England women's development teams, including at the 2014 U-20 World Cup, 2016 U-17 World Cup and European finals at under-19 (twice) and under-17 level. In total she managed more than 90 England international fixtures in 11 years with the Football Association. She was also part of the England senior team coaching team for UEFA Women's Euro 2017. Grainger was appointed Wales manager in March 2021 on a four-year contract.

Managerial statistics

References

External links
 

1982 births
Living people
English women's football managers
Wales women's national football team managers